John Smith, DCL was a Welsh  Anglican priest in the 16th century.

HSmith was educated at the University of Oxford. He held the living at Shepperton. He was  an advocate of Doctors Commons; and was Archdeacon of Llandaff until 1564.

References

Archdeacons of Llandaff
16th-century Welsh Anglican priests
Alumni of the University of Oxford